Gankhak-e Raisi (also Romanized as Gankhak-e Ra’īsī; also known as Gankhak-e Ro’sā, Kankhak-e Ra’īsī, and Kankhak-e Ro’sā) is a village in Kaki Rural District, Kaki District, Dashti County, Bushehr Province, Iran. At the 2006 census, its population was 66, in 15 families.

References 

Populated places in Dashti County